Super Modern Artistic Performance (stylized as super.modern.artistic.performance) is the eighteenth studio album of Japanese boy band SMAP, released on September 24, 2008 by Victor Entertainment in Japan. The album features work from Japanese-Canadian pop-rock band Monkey Majik, Korean singer-songwriter Park Jin-young, Japanese electronic musician and Capsule member Yasutaka Nakata and Black Eyed Peas member will.i.am. The album debuted and peaked at number one in the Oricon Weekly Charts with 214,000 units sold on its first week of release and is certified Platinum by the RIAJ. This has made SMAP achieved total album sales of ten million, being the second musical group of vocalists after Chage and Aska to achieve the sales total.

Track listing
 Disc 1
 Theme of 019 super.modern.artistic.performance
 この瞬間、きっと夢じゃない
 Jazz
 Love Loser
 あなたのためにできること
 Keep On 
 Mermaid
 ひとつだけの愛〜アベ・マリア
 はじまりのうた
 ココロパズルリズム
 そのまま
 Last Smile
 Still U
 どうか届きますように
Disc 2
 宮下がつくったうた
 Style
 Life Walker
 ソウデス!
 Here Is Your Hit

Charts, sales and certifications

Charts

Sales and certification

References

External links
Album profile in Oricon 
Official website  
Oricon profile 

2008 albums
Victor Entertainment albums
Japanese-language albums
Albums produced by will.i.am